Laft castle is a historical castle located in Qeshm County in Hormozgan Province, The longevity of this fortress dates back to the Qajar dynasty.

References 

Castles in Iran
Qajar castles